The Call is a historic breed of small domestic duck. It is believed to have originated in the Netherlands, where the earliest descriptions and depictions of it date from the seventeenth century. It is similar in appearance to some other breeds of duck, but is much smaller, with a round head and very short bill. Ducks, but not drakes, are very loquacious and noisy, with a piercing high-pitched call which be heard from far away.

The Call was in the past used as a decoy duck, to attract wild duck into traps.

History 

The first recorded mentions of the breed are from the Netherlands where it was used as a decoy and known as a coy or decoy duck. The high-pitched distinctive call was used to lure other ducks into funnel traps. Later, hunters would tether call ducks to draw other species within range. It is believed to have originally come from the Far East, although no records of its introduction to the Netherlands exist. Other bantam breeds are known to have been imported to the Netherlands in the 17th century and Van Gink, writing in The Feathered World in 1932, supposes "There is a possibility that importations were made by Dutch captains from Japan ... especially as the Call Duck's type is very different from the ordinary European type of duck to sport from it, and since they breed so true they must be a very old-established breed."

It was introduced to the British Isles by the 1850s. By 1865, it was one of the first six waterfowl breeds to be standardized there, but by the middle of the 20th century they were rare. Determined efforts by a few breeders re-popularized the breed and today they are common.  They are popular exhibition birds and win more duck championships in shows in North America than any other breed. Call duck themed cafés, where the ducks are petted by customers, have been opened in various cities of China.

Australian call duck
Though in many ways similar, the Australian Poultry Standard Committee considers the call ducks present in Australia a separate breed to the call duck of the rest of the world, citing evidence of its independent development in South Australia as a mutation in domestic mallard flocks belonging to Hamish Russel. The committee therefore put into motion a renaming of the breed for the 2nd edition, 2011, of their standard. The Australian Poultry Standards states in its introduction of the Australian call that the breed is noticeably larger and has a different colour range to North American calls.

Characteristics 

In the Netherlands about twenty colours are recognised; about the same number are recognised by the British Waterfowl Association and the Poultry Club of Great Britain in the United Kingdom. In the United States the grey and white varieties were included in the first Standard of Perfection of the American Poultry Association in 1874; six other colours were added between 1977 and 2007.

References 

Duck breeds
Duck breeds originating in the Netherlands